Monongahela or Mon Valley may refer to:

Places
Monongahela, Pennsylvania, a city in Washington County
Monongahela Cemetery, a historic cemetery in Monongahela City, Pennsylvania
Monongahela City Bridge, spans the Monongahela River
Monongahela National Forest, a national forest in eastern West Virginia
Monongahela River, a tributary of the Ohio River
Battle of the Monongahela (9 July 1755), at the beginning of the French and Indian War
Lake Monongahela, former Proglacial lake in Pennsylvania, West Virginia, and Ohio
 Monongahela Formation, a geologic group

Railways
Monongahela Railway, a coal-hauling short line railroad in Pennsylvania and West Virginia in the United States
Monongahela Connecting Railroad, a small industrial railroad in Pittsburgh, Pennsylvania
Monongahela Freight Incline, a funicular railway that scaled Mount Washington
Monongahela Incline, a funicular located near the Smithfield Street Bridge in Pittsburgh, Pennsylvania

Other
Monongahela (album), a 1988 album by The Oak Ridge Boys
Monongahela (fish), a genus of prehistoric fish
Monongahela virus, an Orthohantavirus
Monongahela culture, a Native American group
USS Monongahela, one of various ships of the United States Navy
 the Mon Valley, a variant name of the PATrain commuter rail service
Monongahela, a whaleship lost in 1853.